Thomas Parker (29 March 1891 – 25 November 1967) was a Welsh international rugby union flanker who played club rugby for Swansea. Parker made his debut for Swansea in 1913 and captained his club in the 1920/21 season Parker would play 15 times for Wales, seven of them as captain. He was surprisingly one of the most successful captains in the history of Welsh rugby with 6 wins and 1 draw, all played during the 1920s, a decade that is seen as the worst period in Welsh rugby.

International rugby career

Unusual for a new international, Parker gained his first cap against a touring side. In 1919 Parker was chosen to play against the New Zealand Army XV, and the next season would face all the home nations. His first game against England saw a Welsh team filled with new caps, so it was an impressive win when Wales beat their rivals 19–5, with Jerry Shea scoring 16 of the points. Parker's first international try came in 1920 in a match against Ireland at the Cardiff Arms Park. One of Parker's more memorable matches came in 1923 against France when, along with Steve Morris of Cross Keys, he spent large parts of the game fighting against an overly violent French squad.

International matches played
Wales
  1920, 1921, 1922, 1923
  1921, 1922, 1923
  1920, 1921, 1922
  New Zealand Army XV 1919
  1920, 1921, 1922, 1923

Bibliography

References

1891 births
1967 deaths
Rugby union flankers
Rugby union players from Swansea
Swansea RFC players
Wales international rugby union players
Wales rugby union captains